is a 2007 Japanese action horror film directed by Kenta Fukasaku.

Plot
Recovering from a failed love affair, Shiyori and her best friend Aiko decide to travel to the country on vacation. Arriving at a village, the two friends soon discover the villagers are all a part of a brutal cult.

Cast
 Nao Matsushita as Shiyori
 Ami Suzuki as Aiko
 Shoko Nakagawa 
 Maju Ozawa 
 Hiroyuki Ikeuchi

References

External links
 

2007 horror films
2007 films
Films based on Japanese novels
Films directed by Kenta Fukasaku
Japanese horror films
Japanese slasher films
2000s Japanese films
Films about cults

ja:そのケータイはXXで#映画